The 1991 Vuelta a España was the 46th edition of the Vuelta a España, one of cycling's Grand Tours. The Vuelta began in Mérida, with an individual time trial on 29 April, and Stage 10 occurred on 8 May with a stage to Andorra la Vella. The race finished in Madrid on 19 May.

Stage 1
29 April 1991 — Mérida to Mérida,  (TTT)

Stage 2a
30 April 1991 — Mérida to Cáceres,

Stage 2b
30 April 1991 — Montijo to Badajoz,  (TTT)

Stage 3
1 May 1991 — Badajoz to Seville,

Stage 4
2 May 1991 — Seville to Jaén,

Stage 5
3 May 1991 — Linares to Albacete,

Stage 6
4 May 1991 — Albacete to Valencia,

Stage 7
5 May 1991 — Palma de Mallorca to Palma de Mallorca,

Stage 8
6 May 1991 — Cala d'Or to Cala d'Or,  (ITT)

Stage 9
7 May 1991 — Sant Cugat del Vallès to Lloret de Mar,

Stage 10
8 May 1991 — Lloret de Mar to Andorra la Vella,

References

1991 Vuelta a España
Vuelta a España stages